Cosmina is a genus of flies in the family Rhiniidae.

Species
C. acoma Séguy, 1958
C. aenea (Fabricius, 1805)
C. aethiopissa Séguy, 1958
C. arabica Robineau-Desvoidy, 1830
C. aucheri Séguy, 1946
C. bagdadensis Mawlood & Abdul-Rassoul, 2008
C. bezziana Villeneuve, 1932
C. biplumosa (Senior-White, 1924)
C. calida Bezzi, 1923
C. claripennis Robineau-Desvoidy, 1830
C. confusa Malloch, 1929
C. coomani Séguy, 1946
C. ebejeri Deeming, 1996
C. fishelsohni Rognes, 2002
C. fuscipennis Robineau-Desvoidy, 1830
C. gracilis Curran, 1927
C. griseoviridis (Bezzi, 1914)
C. hainanensis Fang & Fan, 1988
C. limbipennis (Macquart, 1848)
C. madagascariensis (Zumpt, 1962)
C. maindroni Séguy, 1946
C. margaritae Peris, 1952
C. maroccana Séguy, 1949
C. metallina Becker, 1912
C. nepalica Kurahashi & Thapa, 1994
C. nigrocoerulea Malloch, 1926
C. nipae Kurahashi, 1995
C. par Zumpt, 1956
C. petiolata Malloch, 1926
C. pinangiana Bigot, 1874
C. prasina (Brauer & von Bergenstamm, 1889)
C. pseudoprasina Becker, 1912
C. punctulata Malloch, 1926
C. similans Becker, 1912
C. simplex (Walker, 1858)
C. testaceipes Peris, 1956
C. thailandica Kurahashi, 1995
C. undulata Malloch, 1926
C. upembae Zumpt, 1967
C. vanidae Kurahashi, 1995
C. villiersi (Zumpt, 1964)
C. viridia (Townsend, 1917)
C. viridis (Townsend, 1917)

References

Oestroidea genera
Rhiniidae
Taxa named by Jean-Baptiste Robineau-Desvoidy